"Soy el Mismo" (English: "I'm the Same") is a 2013 bachata song by American recording artist Prince Royce. The song was released in August 2014 as the fourth single lifted from Royce's third studio album, Soy el Mismo (2013). In the same month, he released a Regional Mexican version with Roberto Tapia. This version was referred in the title as Versión Banda (Band Version).

Music video
The music video was released on August 8, 2014. A week later on August 15, 2014 he released remake of the video which included Roberto Tapia and the Band version of the song.

Charts

Weekly charts

Year-end charts

Certifications

References

2013 songs
2014 singles
Prince Royce songs
Bachata songs
Songs written by Prince Royce
Sony Music Latin singles